The 1987 Washington Huskies football team was an American football team that represented the University of Washington during the 1987 NCAA Division I-A football season.  In its 13th season under head coach Don James, the team compiled a 7–4–1 record, finished in third place in the Pacific-10 Conference, and outscored its opponents by a combined total of 295 to 254.  David Rill was selected as the team's most valuable player.  Rill, Chris Chandler, Darryl Franklin, Brian Habib were the team captains.

Schedule

Roster

Game summaries

Arizona State

NFL Draft
Five Huskies were selected in the 1988 NFL Draft.

References

Washington
Washington Huskies football seasons
Independence Bowl champion seasons
Washington Huskies football